Trawler may refer to:

Boats
 Fishing trawler, used for commercial fishing
 Naval trawler, a converted trawler, or a boat built in that style, used for naval purposes
 Trawlers of the Royal Navy
 Recreational trawler, a pleasure boat built trawler-style

Books
 Trawler, a book by Redmond O'Hanlon